is a retired Japanese professional infielder.

External links

Living people
1973 births
Baseball people from Wakayama Prefecture
Japanese baseball players
Nippon Professional Baseball infielders
Fukuoka Daiei Hawks players
Nippon Ham Fighters players
Hokkaido Nippon-Ham Fighters players
Chiba Lotte Marines players
Japanese baseball coaches
Nippon Professional Baseball coaches